Jaban is a Bengali romantic drama film directed by Palash Banerjee. This film was released in 1972. Amitabh Bacchan, Dharmendra and Shatrughan Sinha appeared as guest actors in this movie.

Plot
Binu and Laxmi love each other. They want to marry but Laxmi's uncle sells her to Janardan, who sends her to a brothel. Binu is framed for theft and sent to prison.

Cast
 Samit Bhanja as Binu
 Radha Saluja as Laxmi
 Amitabh Bachchan as Dalaljit
 Dharmendra
 Shatrughan Sinha
 Biswajit Chatterjee
 Ajitesh Bandopadhyay
 Shambhu Bhattacharya
 Kajal Gupta
 Chinmoy Roy
 Anubha Gupta
 Dilip Roy

References

External links
 

1972 films
Bengali-language Indian films
Indian drama films
1970s Bengali-language films
1972 drama films